In computing,  is a command in the command-line interpreters (shells) of Microsoft Windows and ReactOS. It is used to search for a specific text string in computer files.

Overview
The command sends the specified lines to the standard output device.
It is similar to the find command. However, while the find command supports UTF-16, findstr does not. On the other hand, findstr supports regular expressions, which find does not.
The findstr program was first released as part of the Windows 2000 Resource Kit under the name qgrep.

findstr cannot search for null bytes commonly found in Unicode computer files.

Syntax
 FINDSTR flags strings [drive:][path]filename[...]

Arguments:
flags This can be any combination of flags described below.
strings Text to be searched for.
[drive:][path]filename Specifies a file or files to search.

Flags: 
/B Matches pattern if at the beginning of a line.
/E Matches pattern if at the end of a line.
/L Uses search strings literally.
/R Uses search strings as regular expressions.
/S Searches for matching files in the current directory and all subdirectories.
/I Specifies that the search is not to be case-sensitive.
/X Prints lines that match exactly.
/V Prints only lines that do not contain a match.
/N Prints the line number before each line that matches.
/M Prints only the filename if a file contains a match.
/O Prints character offset before each matching line.
/P Skip files with non-printable characters.
/OFF[LINE] Do not skip files with offline attribute set.
/A:attr Specifies color attribute with two hex digits. See "color /?"
/F:file Reads file list from the specified file(/ stands for console).
/C:string Uses specified string as a literal search string.
/G:file Gets search strings from the specified file(/ stands for console).
/D:dir Search a semicolon delimited list of directories

Note:
Following command displays the detailed help about this command:
  FINDSTR /?

Example
Save your running services into file _services.txt and search in this file for lines containing word "network" - case insensitive:
  @echo off
  set searchstr=network
  net start>_services.txt  
  FINDSTR /I "%searchstr%" _services.txt
  pause
output would be: 
 Network Connections
 Network List Service
 Network Location Awareness
 Network Store Interface Service
 Windows Media Player Network Sharing Service
Press any key to continue . . .

See also

Regular expression
Wildcard character
List of DOS commands
find
grep

References

Further reading

External links
findstr | Microsoft Docs

Microcomputer software
Windows administration
Pattern matching